Mary Harris is an American keyboardist, singer, songwriter, arranger, and producer. She is currently appearing on stage as a member of the five-time Grammy Award nominated band Ambrosia. Harris, as a member of Jimmy Buffett's Coral Reefer Band arranged vocals and sang on recordings and live performances, and has worked with Stewart Copeland and Stanley Clarke, and recorded for Pink Floyd. She is also a founding member of the group Tin Drum along with her husband and musical partner Burleigh Drummond who also performs with her in Ambrosia.

Childhood 
Harris began playing piano at age four, starting formal lessons at age five. She grew up from early childhood in the town of Three Rivers, California where she performed from age ten on with family members locally.

Early music career 
Harris' first paying music performances were with bands including Oak Grove and Fair Game in Three Rivers in the seventies and early eighties. She moved to Los Angeles, California in 1982.

Professional career 

Mary Harris is perhaps best known for her singing and vocal arranging with Jimmy Buffett as a long-time member of the Coral Reefer Band. She joined Buffett's band on the recommendation of Coral Reefer Band singer Brie Howard. Harris has performed and recorded with numerous notable music acts including Stewart Copeland, and Stanley Clarke in the band Animal Logic

Harris joined the progressive rock group Ambrosia in 2012 as a full-time member, and is currently active in touring, composing and recording with the band, which includes her husband and Ambrosia founding member Burleigh Drummond.

Tin Drum and Bill Champlin's Wunderground
Besides Ambrosia, Harris and Drummond perform together onstage in California with two other groups: their own band Tin Drum, formed in the 1990s, which has released three albums to date, and Bill Champlin’s Wunderground, since 2018.

References

External links 

 Mary Harris sings “Surrender” with Tin Drum
 Mary Harris in Jimmy Buffett's Coral Reefer Band
 Mary Harris sings her composition "Honesty" with the 1980s all-female band Red Shoes
 Mary Harris performing live in Europe with Stewart Copeland and Stanley Clarke in the band Animal Logic
 Mary Harris and Burleigh Drummond interviewed by Gonzo Today in 2017

Living people
Ambrosia (band) members
Year of birth missing (living people)
American rock singers
Coral Reefer Band members
MCA Records artists